Buffy the Vampire Slayer is an action beat 'em up video game addition to the Buffy the Vampire Slayer franchise. It is the second video game of the franchise to be released, though the earliest in terms of setting and the first for a console. The novella and dialogue of the game were written by Christopher Golden and Thomas Sniegoski, with additional dialogue provided by Richard Hare.

Story
In a dream sequence, Giles takes Buffy for training in an old Spanish Mission. Buffy fights her way through, opening the door to the chapel where she is transported to the Sunken Church. There she encounters three demons and the Master, who attacks her. Moments later, Buffy wakes up from the nightmare.

The next night, Buffy is practicing cheerleading (as a favor to Cordelia) when the power goes out and vampires invade the school. Buffy eventually finds the school janitor dead, and uses his keys to access the basement and restore the power. She then rushes to the library, to save Giles from a vampire named Malik, who escapes with a book on spirit channeling. Giles is unable to determine why Malik wanted the book but isn't worried, so Buffy and her friends head to The Bronze. At the same time, Malik is revealed to be working for Spike who has returned to Sunnydale and regrouped the Order of Aurelias. Spike uses the book to summon the spirit of an ancient being named Laibach who possesses Drusilla in order to force Spike to do its bidding. Laibach orders Spike to get fresh human sacrifices for a coming ceremony and he dispatches vampires to the Bronze then he encounters Buffy.

At the Bronze, Buffy and the others party until the vampires, led by one named Scylla, break in and kidnap several students, including Willow. Buffy chases the vampires outside where she encounters and fights off Spike. Buffy continues to follow the vampires in hopes of rescuing her friends and eventually ends up in the cemetery where she encounters the powerful necromancer Materiani who summons zombies to aid in delaying her. Buffy fights through waves of vampires, zombies and hellhounds to a mausoleum where she finds Scylla and Willow. Buffy fights Scylla who, like Malik, proves more powerful than an ordinary vampire. Buffy beats Scylla who flees rather than continue the fight, leaving Willow behind. Realizing that Spike has taken over the Sunken Church and still has more victims, Buffy decides to go after them after consulting with her friends. The group can't come to any conclusion besides that Spike may be trying to draw an ancient evil forth into this world and Buffy sets off again on her own.

Buffy reenters the mausoleum where she fights through zombies to reach the secret passageway leading to the Sunken Church. In the passage she fights more zombies and demonic spiders before finally reaching the Church. Buffy battles her way through the Church, now faced with demons as well as spiders and zombies and finally reaches the altar where the ritual is taking place. She arrives too late to save the victims, but interrupts the ritual causing the vampires to run while Materiani stays behind to fight her. Buffy kills Materiani and takes his Tedarka Talisman, but not before he completes the ritual. To Buffy's shock, the Master is resurrected as a phantom and she flees as the area collapses. Giles explains that while the Master couldn't be resurrected in physical form, a skilled necromancer could bring him back as a phantom though he has no idea why it would be done. Buffy mentions her dream and the appearance of the Master and gives Giles the sigil the demons from the dream wore in hopes that it is a clue. Xander decides to see what information he can get from Willy the Snitch while Buffy heads to Angel's Mansion in hopes he can figure out the Master and Spike's plans.

At the Mansion, Angel tells Buffy only she can save him before being abducted by demons. Buffy fights through the Mansion to try to save him, fighting vampires and demons. Finally, Buffy reaches Angel's training room where she encounters Scylla once more. However, this time, Scylla transforms into a giant snake monster and attacks. Buffy defeats Scylla and kills her by exposing her to sunlight. Angel arrives, but is possessed by the Master, forcing Buffy to flee. As Buffy talks with her friends, she learns that Xander found out that the vampires are expecting a shipment of some sort at the docks and that Giles learned that the sigil represents three demons known as the Dreamers who have great mental powers and can bend reality while together. Buffy decides to kill the Dreamers and takes off with her friends for the docks to intercept the vampires shipment.

At the docks, Buffy finds herself facing an ever-increasing number of vampires, demons and demonic spiders in her way to the ship where the shipment is located. Some of these enemies block her way with forcefields. After a determined battle, Buffy reaches a warehouse where the cargo has been unloaded to find that it is one of the Dreamers. Buffy kills the Dreamer, infuriating the Master who needs it for his and Lybach's plan. The Master comes up with another plan, to use a mixture of steel and blood to forge a Deglon Sphere that will amplify the remaining Dreamers powers and allow the plan to work. He sends his men to take control of a local foundry and Malik and Spike to stop Buffy. However, he enrages Spike by threatening Drusilla. Buffy learns from Willow that she has discovered how to exorcise the Master from Angel but they have to find him first.

As Buffy heads out to find someone to lead her to the Master, demons and vampires attack the high school again, injuring Cordelia. Buffy battles through the school, learning along the way that there is a bomb in the basement. Buffy disarms the bomb and faces Malik once more who transforms into sabertoothed animal. Buffy defeats and stakes Malik, but fails to kill him, something that she fails to realize. As Malik attacks again, Spike suddenly kills him and saves Buffy. Spike offers an alliance to stop the Master and save Angel and Buffy reluctantly accepts. Spike explains to Buffy and her friends that an Old One named Laibach has a plan to build a bridge from his demon dimension to Earth in order to lead an army of demons to take over the world. He needed the Dreamers to warp reality to create the bridge and the Master's expertise in dimensional portals to make it work. Spike is only helping as Laibach is possessing Drusilla and threatens to destroy her mind if he doesn't. However, Spike doesn't like the plan and has had enough. He offers to lead the group to the Master and help save Angel in exchange for their help in saving Drusilla. The group reluctantly agrees and sets out for the foundry.

At the foundry, Buffy battles her way in to the Master while her friends and Spike work on locating and rescuing Drusilla. Buffy fights through a determined vampire and demon resistance before finally reaching the Master. Buffy and the Master fight it out and Buffy defeats the Master but can't kill him without harming Angel. As the Master taunts her, Buffy reveals she hasn't come alone and Willow exorcises the Master as Xander and Giles exorcise Laibach from Drusilla. The Master attempts to possess Spike but Willow's spell protects him and the Master flees angrily. However, Angel reveals that it is not over as the Order got the Deglon Sphere and the Master intends to continue the plan even without Laibach's guidance. Having gotten what he wants, Spike and Drusilla leave and Buffy and her friends make preparations to assault the Sunken Church to stop the Master once and for all. Giles determines to Buffy's dismay that he and the others must perform a spell to give the Master back physical form so that Buffy can destroy him again as he is too powerful to be destroyed by an exorcism and Willow gives her the Tedarka Talisman to help guide her through any warped realities that the Dreamers may come up with.

Buffy battles through electrical tunnels and eventually reaches the Sunken Church. Buffy has to battle through an army of vampires and demons before she finally reaches the Master and the Dreamers. However, rather than fight, the Master casts Buffy into the Dreamers' realm where she has to find her way through the levels of a giant maze. Buffy manages to make it through the maze with the help of the Tedarka Talisman. Finally, Buffy finds the Dreamers at the end of the maze and kills them both, returning her to the Sunken Church and destroying the Deglon Sphere. With the Master and Laibach's plan thwarted, Buffy faces off against the Master himself as her friends' spell takes effect. Finally, Buffy impales the Master on a giant stake and kills him once more. She and the others flee the Sunken Church as it collapses. Later that night, the group celebrates at the Bronze before Buffy must take off after a vampire, her work never done.

Characters

The Scooby Gang
Buffy Summers - The Slayer.
Rupert Giles - Sunnydale High School's librarian and Buffy's Watcher.
Xander Harris - Buffy's friend who provides weapons, assistance and information throughout the game.
Cordelia Chase - Buffy's friend, Xander's girlfriend and the head cheerleader who often provides assistance and witty commentary.
Willow Rosenberg - Buffy's best friend who is also a witch. Willow often provides Buffy with magical help throughout the game.
Angel - The vampire with a soul and Buffy's boyfriend. He is briefly possessed by the spirit of the Master before Willow and Buffy exorcise him.

The Enemies
Laibach of the Abyss - An Old One who is a very powerful and ancient demon. Laibach is the mastermind of the plot that Buffy and her friends must thwart, gathering forces on Earth in order to build a bridge between his Hell dimension and Earth so that Laibach can lead an army through to conquer the world. Through possessing Drusilla, he is able to force Spike to do his bidding. Laibach is eventually exorcised from Drusilla by Xander and Giles and his plot is thwarted by Buffy who kills both the Dreamers and the resurrected Master. Throughout the game, Laibach only appears by possessing Drusilla and is only present in the scene where he gives Spike directions, when Buffy interrupts the Master's resurrection and when Xander and Giles perform an exorcism over an unconscious Drusilla.
Spike - An old enemy of Buffy's who reluctantly returns to Sunnydale in order to lead the early stages of the plot. He is only taking part through coercion and later switches sides to help Buffy save Angel and his beloved Drusilla. Following Laibach's exorcism, he leaves town with Drusilla.
Drusilla - Spike's insane girlfriend who is possessed by Laibach for much of the game in order to blackmail Spike into helping him. After Laibach is exorcised from Drusilla by Xander and Giles, she and Spike leave town.
Malik - A very powerful vampire who has the ability to shapeshift into a sabertoothed animal. The game's novella states that he is an ancient vampire Master originating from Tibet. He acts as one of the Master and Laibach's lieutenants during the game, stealing the book from the library and leading an attempt to blow up Sunnydale High. After being defeated by Buffy for a second time, he is killed by Spike who throws a spear through Malik's back after Buffy's staking fails to kill him.
Scylla - A very powerful vampire who has the ability to shapeshift into a giant snake-like creature. Scylla leads the kidnapping of the teenagers from the Bronze, including Willow, but Buffy manages to defeat her and rescue Willow, forcing Scylla to retreat. Scylla later attacks Buffy at Angel's Mansion in her snake form, but the Slayer finally manages to kill Scylla by exposing her to sunlight.
Materiani - A demonic necromancer summoned by Spike on Laibach's orders. Materiani first appears to raise the dead throughout the Sunnydale cemetery in an effort to stop Buffy from rescuing the captured teens from the Bronze. He subsequently performs a ritual to resurrect the Master using the teens as a sacrifice, but it is interrupted by Buffy. Buffy manages to kill Materiani, but he completes the ritual, resurrecting the Master in a ghostly form. Materiani's Tedarka Talisman is recovered by Buffy and is subsequently used by both Buffy and Willow in their efforts to stop the Master's plans.
The Dreamers - Urd, Skuld and Verdandi, a triumvirate of powerful demons with the ability to warp reality within a certain proximity, particularly when they are all together. Laibach seeks to use their power to warp reality and create a bridge between his hell dimension and Earth. Having seen the Dreamers in a nightmare, Buffy is able to identify them as a threat. Although the Master's forces succeed in bringing together Skuld and Verdandi, Buffy and her friends intercept the arrival of Urd and Buffy manages to slay the demon. Undaunted, the Master creates a Deglon Sphere to amplify the remaining Dreamers' powers and throws Buffy into a twisted reality created by the remaining two demons. Using Materiani's Tedarka Talisman, Buffy fights through their reality and slays Skuld and Verdandi, destroying the Deglon Sphere and thwarting Laibach's plot.
The Master - An ancient and powerful vampire more than six centuries old and the leader of the Order of Aurelias who had previously attempted to open the Hellmouth. Buffy slayed the Master and then ground his bones to dust in order to prevent his followers from resurrecting him. The Master is resurrected in a ghostly form by Materiani on the orders of Laibach due to the Old One needing the Master's expertise in opening dimensional portals for his plot. The Master possesses Angel and spearheads the plan to use the Dreamers to build the bridge between worlds, particularly after Laibach is exorcised from Drusilla. However, Buffy and Willow manage to exorcise the Master from Angel and Buffy destroys the Dreamers. In a final confrontation, Buffy's friends perform a spell in order to give the Master's spirit corporeal form, allowing Buffy to stake him once again, killing the Master for a second time and destroying his spirit.

Development
This project started as a PlayStation game, but development was moved to the Dreamcast and Windows. These versions were later scrapped, and development was moved to the Xbox.

The game was re-released as part of the Xbox Classics series.

While Buffy the Vampire Slayer was advertised as a single-player game, it has a hidden multiplayer mode, apparently for debugging purposes.

The game starts with a variation of the expository narrative that was featured in the early Buffy episodes, as well as a variation on the opening titles sequence. However, both of these are made up of game footage.

Reception

The game received "favorable" reviews according to the review aggregation website Metacritic. Ryan MacDonald, writing for GameSpot, said that it "is a terrific action game that has a great mix of multiple gameplay types and a great story." According to GameSpot, the game was commercially unsuccessful.

The Cincinnati Enquirer gave it a score of four stars out of five and stated that "Video games based on TV franchises don't always live up to the shows that inspired them. Fortunately, Buffy the Vampire Slayer is an exception."  Entertainment Weekly gave it a B and said that "as vampire videogames go, Slayer doesn't suck." Maxim gave it seven out of ten and called it "eye-popping".

GameSpot named Buffy the runner-up for its August 2002 "Xbox Game of the Month" award. It won the publication's annual "Best Game No One Played on Xbox" award, and was nominated in the "Best Action Adventure Game on Xbox" category.

References

External links
 

2002 video games
Action video games
Beat 'em ups
Cancelled Dreamcast games
Cancelled PlayStation (console) games
Cancelled Windows games
Fox Interactive games
Single-player video games
The Collective (company) games
Video games about witchcraft
Video games based on Buffy the Vampire Slayer
Video games developed in the United States
Video games set in California
Xbox games
Xbox-only games